Unley Road is a road in the City of Unley, located south of the City of Adelaide, the capital of South Australia. It runs from South Terrace to Cross Road, where it becomes Belair Road. The road was named after the family name of the wife of Thomas Whistler, owner of land in Unley which was laid out around 1857.

The road contains numerous cafés, restaurants, shops and churches. It is known for its boutique shopping scene selling designer fashion and artisan gifts and homewares.
The road is two-lane with parking on both sides plus bicycle lanes. A tramline ran through the road up until the 1960s.

Notable traders
Pubs include The Unley and the Cremorne Hotel.

Major intersections

See also

References

Streets in Adelaide
Shopping districts and streets in Australia